Australian Ethical is an Australian ethical investment manager based in Sydney.

Australian Ethical has $8.68 billion in funds under management and around 115,000 clients (managed fund investors and funded superannuation members) .

The company was a founding B Corp in Australia. It was awarded the B Corp "Best for the World" ranking it in the top 10% of B Corps globally in various categories in the years 2015 through 2019, 2021 and 2022.

Australian Ethical Charter 

The company works off the framework provided by the Australian Ethical Charter, a list of 23 principles that have been part of the company constitution since 1986. The Charter is used to make decisions about the companies Australian Ethical will and won't invest in.

Products & services 

The company offers a number of superannuation, managed fund and ETF products.

Community giving 

Australian Ethical distributes up to 10% of its annual profits (after tax and before bonuses) to charitable organisations and social impact initiatives through the Australian Ethical Foundation.

To date, the Australian Ethical Foundation has granted over $6 million through community and strategic grants. In FY21 the company donated $1.8 million through the foundation. The Community Grants selection process uses community voting to help decide the projects that are most important to the Australian community by engaging shareholders, members, staff and the public to have their will.

Ethical investing 
Australian Ethical screens potential investments for adherence to the Australian Ethical Charter.

References

External links
Official site

Companies listed on the Australian Securities Exchange
Financial services companies based in Sydney
Investment companies of Australia
Superannuation in Australia
Financial services companies established in 1986
Australian companies established in 1986
Ethical investment
B Lab-certified corporations in Australia